Laughing Pizza was a family band who wrote and performed all-original kids' pop music. Their music videos could be seen every day in over 18 million homes on PBS stations and TV On-Demand around the United States. The mom, dad, and daughter trio traveled across the United States performing at theaters, museums, music festivals, nightclubs, schools, and other venues – including the White House (twice, including with Miley Cyrus and the Jonas Brothers). Laughing Pizza had also been featured on the Today Show, CNN, and Fox stations, as well as in Money Magazine, The New York Times, Atlanta Magazine, Star Magazine, and the Huffington Post among others. They were the proud recipients of 7 Parents' Choice Awards, and their new one-hour docu-concert, "Laughing Pizza LIVE" had won  a NAPPA award, as well as 5 Dove Awards and raving reviews from the Parents' Television Council.

The late Lisa Michaelis and the living Billy Schlosser are both classically trained musicians and former music teachers. Emily, their living daughter, played multiple instruments including flute, drums, guitar, piano, and bass. She also co-wrote every Laughing Pizza song with her parents.

Laughing Pizza has released two DVDs and 5 CDs on their label “Little Bean Family Entertainment” and are the recipients of seven Parents’ Choice Awards. Their song “On My Way” was chosen by Julie Andrews and her daughter Emma Walton Hamilton (who co-wrote the lyrics) to be featured in the book “Julie Andrews Collection of Songs, Poems, and Lullabies” (Little/Brown).

Background
Before Laughing Pizza, Billy and Lisa both started performing in indie bands such as Strap d’etr0, Hot Boxes of Truth, Shade, and later wrote and recorded a #1 Dance single in 1992 (Rainfalls, produced by Frankie Knuckles on Virgin records). Four years of being songwriters with Warner/Chappell and songs for Mary-Kate and Ashley Olsen, the TV show “Big Bag”, plus a math CD that is used in schools in several states, steered them toward writing for kids. Shortly after daughter Emily was born, Billy and Lisa quit the music business and moved from their native New York to Atlanta and Billy became an Executive at IBM and went on to manage global accounts at the tech consulting company, Sapient.

On Tuesday morning September 11, 2001, Billy was on a flight to Boston for one of his frequent business trips. This experience changed their lives as Billy was trapped in Boston for a week and was finally able to drive the 25 hours back to Atlanta to be with his family. Billy and Lisa decided they should find a way to spend time as a family, while doing what they enjoyed most –making music together – and Laughing Pizza was created. Laughing Pizza started as a self-funded project on their home grown label called “Little Bean Family Entertainment” and released two CDs and two DVDs (every one of which earned them Parents’ Choice Awards). In 2006, Sony entered into a joint venture to release and distribute Laughing Pizza on Epic Records and Sony Wonder, their kids' music label. Unfortunately, 6 months after the deal was signed, Sony Wonder folded and Laughing Pizza was left on a rock label with the likes of Good Charlotte, J-Lo, Shakira, Sean Kingston, and Celine Dion. Both parties decided to end the joint venture in 2008 so that Laughing Pizza could continue on their musical journey under their kids label, which was reincarnated as Little Bean. The next year was spent performing, writing, and doing the leg work to get their music videos onto many PBS stations nationwide including GPB (all of Georgia); Columbus, OH; New York, San Diego, CA; Idaho; Louisiana; and Philadelphia, PA.

Music
In June 2002, the first album was released, then in 2004, it was followed by Pizza Party. Both won the iParenting Media Award in 2004 for back-to-school season.
2010 brought the release of their new CD “Let’s Go Play!”, a DVD “It’s Pizza Time!” and a new tour, which was supported by Little Bean. In 2011, Laughing Pizza filmed a one-hour concert, which was made to be a TV special and aired as a pledge special in June 2012 on PBS. It got one of the highest ratings ever recorded for the family portion of Pledge - second only to Sesame Street. In keeping with the family-feeling of the event, shot at the Scholastic Theatre in New York City, the band was joined by hosts, celebrity Chef Todd English and his teenage son, Simon. The show also features dancers from the kid and teen program at the acclaimed Broadway Dance Center and a string trio from Juilliard.

This filmed concert was released by Laughing Pizza on May 8, 2012 (available now on On-Demand and on iTunes) as a special two-disk set on DVD and CD and includes the concert, the music from the concert, some brand new, recorded songs, and bonus features. More than just a concert special, this program gives the viewer an inside look into the lives of this unique family as they tell their story in words and music.

The Together Fund
Laughing Pizza also had a not-for-profit foundation, TogetherFund.org, to provide free arts programs for schools including access to songs that would educate, inspire and teach kids to give back to their community, and to encourage families to engage in activities together. They print all their CDs and DVDs on recycled board and paper – working toward a plastic and toxin free product line.

References

Family musical groups